Karoondinha Music & Arts Festival was a music festival which was to be held at Penn's Cave & Wildlife Park in Centre Hall, Pennsylvania. The festival was officially announced on December 9, 2016. The inaugural festival's full lineup was unveiled May 2, 2017, and featured Chance the Rapper, John Legend, ODESZA, Paramore, and Sturgill Simpson as headliners. On June 27, 2017 the festival's official website and social media went dark signaling the festival had been cancelled. Compounded with the festival's reported financial struggles, an overarching factor in the closing of the festival was a result of the May 22nd terrorist attack of an Ariana Grande concert in London. Many consumers feared the possibility of a similar attack taking place at the venue in Penn's Cave, forcing ticket sales to plummet, and subsequently, contributing to the cancellation of the festival.

Musical acts

2017 
On May 2, 2017, the official lineup announcement was made for the inaugural year of the festival, which will be held July 21–23, 2017. The festival will be headlined by Chance the Rapper, John Legend, ODESZA, Paramore, and Sturgill Simpson. The Roots, Porter Robinson, Dillon Francis and Young the Giant are also among the many artists performing at the three day festival.

Below is the lineup listed in the order as they appear on the official lineup poster, as of May 11, 2017:

Chance the Rapper
John Legend
ODESZA
Paramore
Sturgill Simpson
The Roots
Porter Robinson
Dillon Francis
Young the Giant
Chromeo
Alessia Cara
Leon Bridges
X Ambassadors
The Revivalists
Daya
Maren Morris
NEEDTOBREATHE
Misterwives
Jon Bellion
Alunageorge
Marian Hill
Broods
DNCE
St. Lucia
COIN
PVRIS
Grace VanderWaal
Jacob Collier
Us the Duo
Watsky
The Griswolds
Drake White and the Big Fire
Cam
MAX
Colony House
Mavis Staples
Caveman
Jordan Fisher
Morgan James
DREAMERS
Ripe
Lawrence
Busty and the Bass
Wild Child
City of the Sun
Andy Allo
Spencer Ludwig
Shy Girls
Mikaela Davis
Chukwudi Hodge
Alaman

References 

2017 establishments in Pennsylvania
Music festivals in Pennsylvania
Music festivals established in 2017
Music venues in Pennsylvania
Pop music festivals in the United States
Rock festivals in the United States